Ningbo is a city in Zhejiang, China.

Ningbo may also refer to:

 Ningbo Metropolitan Area, A metropolitan area including Ningbo and three other cities in Zhejiang, China

Ningbo dialect, dialect of Wu, one of the subdivisions of Chinese spoken language
Port of Ningbo, in Ningbo, China
3543 Ningbo, main-belt asteroid